The Bhim Award is the highest sports honor given by the government of Haryana, India, for "outstanding performance in national and international competitions". The Bhim Award is to recognize the achievement of those sportspersons who have brought honors to the Haryana State in their games and sports at recognized international championship/cup/games and senior national championship/cup/games.  It began in 2001.

Notable awardees 

 Ranveer Singh Saini -2018- Golf

References

State awards and decorations of India
Haryana